Ramón Rodríguez may refer to:
 Daddy Yankee (born 1977), born Ramón Luis Ayala Rodríguez, Puerto Rican rapper
 Ramón Rodríguez (actor), Puerto Rican-American actor
 Ramón Rodríguez (Salvadoran politician), politician from El Salvador
 Ramón Rodríguez (American politician), American politician
 Ramón Rodríguez (footballer), Peruvian footballer
 Ramón Rodríguez Soto (born 1928), Costa Rican footballer